Eric Maurice Moore (born February 28, 1981) is a former American football defensive end. He was drafted by the New York Giants in the sixth round of the 2005 NFL Draft. He played college football at Florida State.

Moore also played for the New Orleans Saints, St. Louis Rams, Carolina Panthers, New England Patriots and Florida Tuskers.
He is currently married to Petrina Moore, and he has 2 children, Olivia Moore and Eric Moore Jr.

Early years
Moore attended Pahokee High School, playing football and basketball. He was a Second-team USA Today All-USA selection and earned All-South accolades by Fox Sports Net. He helped lead his team to the state finals as a junior, recording 123 tackles and 10 sacks. He was second best linebacker in the nation coming out of high school.

College career
Moore played college football at Florida State where he played in 41 games, recording 82 tackles and 14 sacks, 30.5 stops for losses, 34 quarterback pressures, 4 fumble recoveries, 4 forced fumbles and 8 pass deflections. In 2001, Moore was a reserve defensive end in Florida State's final nine regular season games as a true freshman. He recorded 15 tackles (8 solo) with an 8-yard sack and two stops for losses. He shared playing time at left end in 2002, finishing with 25 tackles (20 solo), 3 sacks, 11 stops behind the line of scrimmage and 9 pressures, despite missing three games after having his appendix removed mid-season. Moore took over right defensive end duties in 2003, earning Second-team All-Atlantic Coast Conference honors. He made 25 tackles (21 solo) with 7.5 sacks, 12 stops behind the line of scrimmage and 15 pressures in twelve games. He finished his senior season in 2004 with 17 tackles (8 solo), 2.5 sacks and 8 pressures.

Professional career

Pre-draft

New York Giants
Moore was selected by the New York Giants in the sixth round (186th overall) in the 2005 NFL Draft. In his rookie season he played in eight games, recording five tackles. He made his debut against the Minnesota Vikings on November 13, 2005. He was released by the Giants on September 2, 2006.

New Orleans Saints
Moore was signed by the New Orleans Saints' practice squad on September 4, 2006. He was elevated to the 53-man roster on September 28, 2006, and made four appearances, recording five tackles before being waived on November 7, 2006. His first recorded sack was against the Philadelphia Eagles in 2006.

St. Louis Rams
Moore signed with the St. Louis Rams as a free agent on November 14, 2006, and made three appearances with three tackles. After being inactive for the first game of the 2007 season, Moore was waived by the Rams on September 15, 2007. He was re-signed to their practice squad on September 19, 2007, and was elevated to the 53-man roster on November 15, 2007. Moore played in seven games including his career first start against the Atlanta Falcons in Week 13. He finished the 2007 season with a career-high nine tackles and his second career sack. In 2008 for the Rams, Moore played in seven games, made 10 tackles and recorded another sack.

He was re-signed by the Rams on March 16, 2009. After spending the 2009 preseason with the Rams, Moore was placed on injured reserve on September 5, 2009, and was released with an injury settlement on September 9, 2009.

Carolina Panthers
Moore signed with the Carolina Panthers' practice squad on November 17, 2009. After finishing the 2009 season on the Panthers' practice squad, he signed a reserved/future contract on January 4, 2010. He was released on September 4, 2010.

Florida Tuskers
Moore was added to the roster of the Florida Tuskers of the United Football League on October 4, 2010, and spent the remainder of the 2010 season with the Tuskers. Moore lead the team with 6 sacks and 3 forced fumbles, with 1 recovery.

New England Patriots
The New England Patriots signed Moore on December 3, 2010. He was active for the first time in the Patriots' Week 14 win over the Chicago Bears, recording a strip-sack of Bears quarterback Jay Cutler in the game. In four games (three starts) with the Patriots in 2010, Moore had 14 tackles, two sacks, and two forced fumbles. He was released during final cuts on September 3, 2011.

Virginia Destroyers
Moore was signed by the Virginia Destroyers on October 11, 2011. He had 5 sacks and 2 forced fumbles. His team won the Championship in 2011.

New England Patriots
On December 10, 2011, Moore was re-signed by the Patriots. He was released on December 20, 2011.

References

External links
 New England Patriots bio
 Carolina Panthers bio
 Florida State Seminoles bio

1981 births
Living people
People from Pahokee, Florida
Players of American football from Florida
American football defensive ends
American football outside linebackers
Florida State Seminoles football players
New York Giants players
New Orleans Saints players
St. Louis Rams players
Carolina Panthers players
Florida Tuskers players
New England Patriots players
Virginia Destroyers players
Pahokee High School alumni